Lega Pro Seconda Divisione was the fourth highest football league in Italy, the lowest with a professional status. Usually it consisted of 36 teams, but in the 2011–12 season, there were 41 teams divided geographically into two divisions of 20 and 21. Group A covered northern and north-central Italy, Group B south-central and southern Italy. 

Until the 2007–08 season, the league was known as Serie C2. 

Before the 1978–79 season, there were only three professional football leagues in Italy, the third being Serie C. In 1978, it was decided to split Serie C into Serie C1 (the third highest league) and Serie C2. Upon its inception in 1978–79, Serie C2 consisted of four divisions, however, that number was reduced to three from the start of the 1991–92 season. The reform, already decided by the FIGC lead to the reunification with the first division starting from 2014–15 and with the subsequent rebirth of the third tier championship organized by the pro league with 60 teams divided into three groups of 20 in Lega Pro.

During the regular season, teams only played the other teams in their division. Each opponent was played twice, once at home and once away, for a total of 34 matches. Games were scheduled such that in the first 17 matches, every opponent was played once. In the last 17 matches, the same opponents were played in the same order, with the only difference being that the venue changed.

Past champions

Serie C2

Seasons from 1978–79 to 1990–91

Seasons from 1991–92 to 2007–08

Lega Pro Seconda Divisione

Seasons from 2008–09 to 2010–11

Seasons from 2011–12 to 2013–14 season

See also
 Italian football league system

  
2
Professional sports leagues in Italy
Defunct football leagues in Italy
Sports leagues established in 1978
1978 establishments in Italy
Sports leagues disestablished in 2014
2014 disestablishments in Italy
Italy